Simeon Chilibonov (born 22 June 1966) is a retired Bulgarian footballer.

Career

Coming through the youth ranks of OFC Pomorie, Chilibonov spent almost his entire career in Bulgaria, mainly playing in the top division of Bulgarian football. In the 1990s, he also had short spells in Germany and Turkey. At a ceremony in December 2013, which commemorated 100 years since the founding of Slavia Sofia, Chilibonov received a prize as one of the most distinguished players in the club's history.

References

1966 births
Living people
Bulgarian footballers
Bulgaria international footballers
Association football midfielders
Association football forwards
FC Chernomorets Burgas players
Neftochimic Burgas players
FC Pomorie players
PFC Dobrudzha Dobrich players
FC Lokomotiv 1929 Sofia players
FC Hebar Pazardzhik players
PFC Slavia Sofia players
First Professional Football League (Bulgaria) players
Second Professional Football League (Bulgaria) players
VfB Lübeck players
Expatriate footballers in Germany
Bulgarian expatriate sportspeople in Germany
Expatriate footballers in Turkey
Bulgarian expatriate sportspeople in Turkey
Bulgarian expatriate footballers
People from Pomorie